Callicarpa macrophylla is a species of beautyberry native to the Indian subcontinent. Its fruits are small white drupes.

Uses
The fruit is edible and can be eaten raw when it ripens. The seeds are poisonous.  The leaves can also be used to make a herbal drink or as decorations.

External links
 Callicarpa macrophylla info

macrophylla
Flora of Nepal